Lucie Hradecká and Kristýna Plíšková were the defending champions, however Plíšková chose not to participate.

Hradecká played alongside Marie Bouzková and successfully defended her title, defeating Viktória Kužmová and Nina Stojanović in the final, 7–6(7–3), 6–4.

Seeds

Draw

Draw

References
Main Draw

Prague Open - Doubles
WTA Prague Open